Aimbridge Hospitality is a global third-party management company with over 1500 hotels globally.

The company was originally founded by Dave Johnson in 2003 with eight hotels.

Operations
Aimbridge operates through six operating divisions: Aimbridge Full Service, Evolution Lifestyle, Aimbridge Enhanced Select Service, Aimbridge Select Service, Aimbridge EMEA, and Aimbridge LATAM.

Aimbridge Full Service 
Aimbridge Full Service is responsible for managing all full-service branded and independent hotels and resorts in its portfolio. It is managed by Rob Smith, Divisional President.

Evolution Lifestyle 
Evolution Lifestyle is responsible for managing "unique lifestyle experiences" throughout its curated collection of independent, boutique, lifestyle, and soft brand hotels. It is headed by William Loughran, Divisional President.

Aimbridge Enhanced Select Service 
Aimbridge Enhanced Select Service is responsible for managing the performance of enhanced select service verticals across all major brands of its portfolio. It is headed by Ben Perelmuter, Divisional President.

Aimbridge Select Service 
Aimbridge Select Service is responsible for managing select service, economy, and extended stay verticals of its portfolio. It is headed by Simon Mendy, Divisional President.

Aimbridge EMEA 
Aimbridge EMEA is responsible for their operations within the United Kingdom, Ireland, and Europe. It is headed by David Anderson, Divisional President.

Aimbridge LATAM 
Aimbridge LATAM is responsible for their operations within Latin America. It is headed by Leandro Castillo, Divisional President.

Notable acquisitions
2015—acquisition of Evolution Hospitality
2016—acquisition of Pillar Hotels and Resorts
2017—acquisition of ONE Lodging Management
2017—acquisition of TMI Hospitality
2019—merger with Interstate Hotels and Resorts
2021—acquisition of Prism Hotels & Resort
2021—acquisition of Grupo Hotelero Prisma (MX)

Controversy
During the 2022 Russian invasion of Ukraine,  a study was published by Yale University on March 28, 2022, and listed Aimbridge as a company "digging in" and continuing normal operations in Russia.

References

External links

Hospitality management
Hospitality companies of the United States